Adam Brian Chanler-Berat (born December 31, 1986) is an American stage and film actor and singer. He is best known for his work on Broadway, originating the roles of Henry in Next to Normal (2008–2011), Boy in Peter and the Starcatcher (2011–2013), and Nino in Amélie (2015–2017). Since 2021, he has played teacher Jordan Glassberg in HBO Max's Gossip Girl.

Early life
Chanler-Berat was born in West Nyack, Rockland County, New York, to Shelley Chanler and Bert Berat.

Career

Theatre
Chanler-Berat made his Off-Broadway debut in the 2008 musical Next to Normal (originally stylized as next to normal), which later transferred to Broadway in 2009. He stayed with the show from its original production at Second Stage Theatre to its closing night on Broadway exactly three years later, being the only cast member to have done so.

Following Next to Normal's closing, Chanler-Berat was cast in the role of Boy (Peter) in the Off-Broadway play Peter and the Starcatcher, based on the book of the same name. The show transferred to Broadway in early 2012, and he remained with the production until its closing during the January of the next year.

After Peter and the Starcatcher, Chanler-Berat participated in a number of Regional and Off-Broadway productions, including Fly By Night as Harold McClam, The Fortress of Solitude as Dylan Ebdus, Sunday in the Park with George as Georges Seurat, and Amélie as Nino, the latter of which transferred to Broadway in 2017.

In 2018, Chanler-Berat starred on Broadway in the play Saint Joan as the Dauphin, Charles VII.

Beginning in 2021, he starred in a limited run Off-Broadway revival of Assassins by Classic Stage Company. The production was directed by John Doyle. Chanler-Berat played John Hinckley, Jr., the attempted assassin of President Ronald Reagan. Originally scheduled to play from April 2 to May 17, 2020, it eventually ran from November 2, 2021 to January 24, 2022.  The production was nominated for a number of awards at the 2022 Lucille Lortel Awards, including Best Revival.

Film and television
In addition to his theatre work, Chanler-Berat has appeared in a number of supporting roles in television and film, beginning with an episode of Law and Order in 2006. Possibly his most notable on screen role is that of Viggo in Delivery Man, a 2013 movie starring Vince Vaughn. Chanler-Berat is currently featured in the reboot of Gossip Girl on HBO Max.

Acting credits

Film

Television

Theatre

Staged readings and concerts

Discography 
Podcasts

 The Fall of the House of Sunshine

Cast recordings

 2009: Next to Normal (Original Broadway Cast Recording)
 2015: Fly By Night (Original Off-Broadway Cast Recording)
 2015: The Fortress of Solitude (Original Cast Recording)
2017: Amélie - A New Musical (Original Broadway Cast Recording)
 2020: (I Am) Nobody's Lunch (World Premiere Recording)

Personal life
Chanler-Berat is of Jewish descent.

References

External links
 
 
 Adam Chanler-Berat at Internet Off-Broadway Database
 Adam Chanler-Berat at About the Artists

21st-century American male actors
American gay actors
American male film actors
American male stage actors
American male video game actors
American people of Jewish descent
Living people
Male actors from New York (state)
People from West Nyack, New York
1986 births
21st-century American LGBT people